Halefoğlu may refer to:

 Halefoğlu, Kars, a village in the central district of Kars Province, Turkey
 Vahit Melih Halefoğlu (1919–2017), Turkish politician and former diplomat

Turkish-language surnames